The People's Republic of China is a one-party state ruled by the Chinese Communist Party (CCP). Despite this, eight subservient political parties officially exist.

Under the one country, two systems principle, the special administrative regions of Hong Kong and Macau, which were previously colonies of European powers, operate under a different political system to the rest of China. Currently, both Hong Kong and Macau possess multi-party systems that were introduced just before the handover of the territories to China.

Legal parties

Ruling party

Minor parties 
While only the CCP holds effective power at the national level, there are officially eight minor parties that exist alongside the CCP under what is officially called the "multi-party cooperation and political consultation under the leadership of the Communist Party of China". These minor parties are officially termed the "Democratic Parties". Founded prior to the proclamation of the People's Republic of China, these parties must accept the "leading role" of the CCP as a condition of their continued existence. The relationship between these parties and the CCP has officially been described as "long-term coexistence and mutual supervision, treating each other with full sincerity and sharing weal or woe". According to Human Rights Watch, these parties "play an advisory rather than an oppositional role". The eight minor parties take part in "united front work" and also take part in the political system, but they have no power at a national level. The Chinese political system allows for the participation of some members of the eight minor parties and other non-CCP members in the National People's Congress (NPC), but they are vetted by the CCP. According to Aaron Friedberg, these parties' "purpose is to create the illusion of inclusiveness and representation." One of the ways the CCP controls the minor parties is through its United Front Work Department (UFWD), which vets the membership applications and controls who is the leader of these parties. UFWD also keeps the parties in check by preventing them from expanding widely in counties and villages. There is officially a ranking system of the parties; the ranking is based on their "contribution to the new democratic revolution".

Other parties

Banned parties 
The following parties formed in China are (or have previously been) banned by the government:
 The Communist Party of China (Marxist–Leninist)  is an anti-revisionist communist party founded in 1976 by several Maoist rebel factions of the Red Guards in Wuhan, Hubei. They believed it was illegal to arrest the Gang of Four and that the new leadership of the CCP is revisionist and unlawful. They were suppressed after attempts at an armed revolt failed in Shanghai, Zhejiang, Canton and Yunnan.
 The Communist Party of China (Workers' and Peasants' Liberation Army) is an anti-revisionist communist party founded in 1976 by a Maoist rebel faction of the Red Guards in Fujian. They used the old fortifications built during the Chinese Civil War and organized a partisan army named the "Workers' and Peasants' Liberation Army". They announced that the new leadership of the CCP is revisionist and called for uprising and reestablished the Party Central Committee. Their activities lasted until 1978.
 The Democracy Party of China was founded by participants of the 1978 Democracy Wall movement and the 1989 Tiananmen Square protests. Founded in 1998, it was declared illegal that same year.
 The Union of Chinese Nationalists supports the ideals of the Pan-Blue Coalition in Taiwan. As such, its goals include establishing a liberal democracy in China, based on Sun Yat-sen's Three Principles of the People. The group originated from an internet forum discussion in August 2004. The Taiwan Affairs Office of the State Council said it is an illegal organization on April 25, 2007.
 The New Democracy Party of China was founded by Guo Quan in Nanjing at the end of 2007.
 The Maoist Communist Party of China is an anti-revisionist communist party founded in 2008. The party seeks to initiate a "second socialist revolution" to re-establish the dictatorship of the proletariat. It has been subject to crackdowns by the Chinese government.
 The Zhi Xian Party, also known as the Chinese Constitutionalist Party in English. Founded by the supporters of Bo Xilai in 2013 and banned in December of that year.
 The Chinese Proletarian Revolutionary Central Committee (abbreviated ) is an anti-revisionist communist party founded in the 2010s by Zhou Qun. The party leaders were members of a rebel faction during the Cultural Revolution, and the committee core consisted of dozens of laid-off workers in Jiangsu. It was suppressed after the police found their "provocative" online activities.

Historical parties 

The Republic of China (ROC) was founded by the Kuomintang (KMT) leader Dr. Sun Yat-sen in 1912. The Kuomintang's prior revolutionary political group, the Revive China Society, was founded on 24 November 1894. It later merged with various other revolutionary groups to form the Tongmenghui in 1905. In August 1911, the Tongmenghui further merged with various other political parties in Beijing to form the KMT. In July 1914, the KMT re-organized itself as the Chinese Revolutionary Party in Tokyo, Japan. In 1919, the party officially renamed itself as Kuomintang of China, which literally translates to Chinese Nationalist Party. It was China's first major political party. In 1921, the CCP was founded by Chen Duxiu and Li Dazhao in Shanghai as a study society and an informal network. Slowly, the CCP began to grow. These were the two major political parties in China during the time when the ROC ruled mainland China from 1911 to 1949.

 Kuomintang
 United Republic Party
 Unity Party
 Progressive Party
 Democratic Party
 Republican Party
 China Democratic Socialist Party
 Chinese Youth Party
 People Constitution Party
 Association of Political Friendship
 China Socialism Party
 Citizen Party
 Dazhong Party
 Chongqing Communist Party
 Oriental Communist Party
 Chinese Youth Communist Party
 Productive People's Party

Notes

References

See also 

 History of political parties in China
 List of ruling political parties by country
 List of political parties in Hong Kong
 List of political parties in Macau

 
China
China
United front (China)